The 1985 Munster Senior Hurling Championship Final was a hurling match played on Sunday 7 July 1985 at Páirc Uí Chaoimh, Cork, County Cork,. It was contested by Cork and Tipperary. Cork captained by Ger Cunningham claimed the title beating Tipperary on a scoreline of 4-17 to 4-11.

References

Munster
Munster Senior Hurling Championship Finals
Tipperary GAA matches
Cork county hurling team matches